Josh Lewis (born 22 March 1992, Merthyr Tydfil) is a Welsh rugby union player who plays for the Dragons as a fly half.

Lewis made his debut for the Scarlets team in 2013 having previously played for Ebbw Vale RFC and Llanelli RFC.

On 28 March 2017, Lewis signs for Aviva Premiership side, Bath ahead of the 2017–18 season.

On 15 January 2018, Lewis returns to Wales to sign for Dragons in the Pro14 from the 2018-19 season.

References 

Rugby union players from Merthyr Tydfil
Welsh rugby union players
Scarlets players
Dragons RFC players
Living people
1992 births
Bath Rugby players
Rugby union fly-halves
Rugby union fullbacks